Michael Braun may refer to:
 Michael Braun (industrialist) (1866–1954), German industrialist and pioneer of the undergarment industry
 Michael Braun (director) (1930–2014), German television director
 Michael Braun (drummer) (born 1953), American drummer with Hall & Oates
 Mike Braun (born 1954), United States senator from Indiana and former member of the Indiana House of Representatives
 Michael Braun (footballer) (born 1978), Australian rules footballer